Traditional Russian units of measurement were standardized and used in Imperial Russia and after the Russian Revolution, but it was abandoned after 21 July 1925, when the Soviet Union adopted the metric system, per the order of the Council of People's Commissars.

The Tatar system is very similar to the Russian one, but some names are different. The Polish system is also very close to the Russian.

The system existed since ancient Rus', but under Peter the Great, the Russian units were redefined relative to the English system. Until Peter the Great the system also used Cyrillic numerals, and only in the 18th century did Peter the Great replace it with the Hindu–Arabic numeral system.

Length
The basic unit was the Russian ell, called the arshin, which came into use in the 16th century.  It was standardized by Peter the Great in the 18th century to measure exactly twenty-eight English inches. Thus, 80 vershoks = 20 piads = 5 arshins = 140 English inches.

A pyad ("palm", "five") or chetvert ("quarter") is a hand span, the distance between ends of the spread thumb and index finger.

Alternative units:
 Swung sazhen (distance between tips of arms stretched sidewards) = 1.76 m
 Skewed, or oblique sazhen (distance between tip of a raised arm and a tip of an opposite leg slightly put away) = 2.48 m / 2.4892 m to be exact, since 1 Kosaya Sazhen is equal to 3.5 Arshins which is equal to 98 inches
 Double versta or border versta,, used to measure land plots and distances between settlements = 2 verstas (comes from an older standard for versta)

Area 
 Desyatina ("a tenth" or "ten"), approximately one hectare
 Treasury/official desyatina = 10,925.4 m2 = 117,600 sq ft = 2.7 acres = 2,400 square sazhen
 Proprietor's = 14,567.2 m2 = 156,800 sq ft = 3,200 square sazhen
 3 proprietor's desyatinas = 4 official desyatinas
 Sokha ("big plow")

Volume
As in many ancient systems of measurement the Russian distinguishes between dry and liquid measurements of capacity. Note that the chetvert appears in both lists with vastly differing values.

Dry measures

Liquid measures

Weight/mass 

Two systems of weight were in use, an ordinary one in common use, and an apothecaries' system.

Ordinary system

The pood was first mentioned in a number of documents of the twelfth century.  It may still be encountered in documents dealing with agricultural production (especially with reference to cereals), and has been revived in determining weights when casting bells in belfries following the rebirth of the Orthodox Churches in the former Soviet lands.

Apothecaries' system
The Imperial Russian apothecaries' weight was defined by setting the grain to be exactly seven-fifths of a dolya.  The only unit name shared between the two was the funt (pound), but the one in the apothecaries' system is exactly seven-eighths of the ordinary funt.

Idiomatic expressions
The obsolete units of measurement survived in Russian culture in a number of idiomatic expressions and proverbs, for example:

 : (It) can be heard a verst away – about something very loud
 : 7 versts is not a detour for a mad dog – about excessive energy or hassle
 : 7 verst is not too far for a darling friend
 : Kolomna verst – about a very tall and slim person (in this case the reference is to the verst pole road mark)
 : A slanted sazhen in the shoulders – about a strong, wide-shouldered person
 : To gauge everybody by the same [literally: one's own] yardstick
 : To swallow an arshin (yardstick) – about standing very straight and still 
 : Two vershok above the pot – a very young child
 : a hundred poods – a very large amount. In modern colloquial Russian it is used in a generic meanings of "very much" and "very", as well as "most surely". The adjective  and the adverb  derive from this expression, although it is more likely a mangled contraction of "100%" (stoprocentny).
 : Seven pyad across the forehead – very smart
 : Not seven pyad across the forehead – not so smart
 : A zolotnik is small, but expensive: when quality rather than quantity is important 
 : To walk in 7-mile steps – any kind of very fast progress, e.g., of improvement
 : To learn how much a pound of likho costs – to experience something bad
 : Do not give up (even) a pyad of land
 : To eat a 'pood' of salt (with somebody) – to have a long common experience with somebody (with the implication "to know someone well")

See also 
 Petrograd Standard

References

External links 
 Russian system of measures of length (brief description) by V. A. Belobrov
 The role of Peter the Great in the development of Russian system of measures of length by V. A. Belobrov

Russian
Russian
Russian units of measurement
History of science and technology in Russia
Standards of Russia
Russia